macOS Catalina (version 10.15) is the sixteenth major release of macOS, Apple Inc.'s desktop operating system for Macintosh computers. It is the successor to macOS Mojave and was announced at WWDC 2019 on June 3, 2019 and released to the public on October 7, 2019. Catalina is the first version of macOS to support only 64-bit applications and the first to include Activation Lock. It is also the last version of macOS to have the major version number of 10; its successor, Big Sur, released on November 12, 2020, is version 11. In order to increase web compatibility, Safari, Chromium and Firefox have frozen the OS in the user agent running in subsequent releases of macOS at 10.15.7 Catalina.

The operating system is named after Santa Catalina Island, which is located off the coast of southern California.

System requirements
macOS Catalina officially runs on all standard configuration Macs that supported Mojave. 2010–2012 Mac Pros, which could run Mojave only with a GPU upgrade, are no longer supported. Catalina requires 4 GB of memory, an increase over the 2 GB required by Lion through Mojave.

iMac (Late 2012 or later)
iMac Pro
MacBook (Early 2015 or later)
MacBook Air (Mid 2012 or later)
MacBook Pro (Mid 2012 or later)
Mac Mini (Late 2012 or later)
Mac Pro (Late 2013 or later)

It is possible to install Catalina on many older Macintosh computers that are not officially supported by Apple. This requires using a patch to modify the install image.

Changes

System

Catalyst
Catalyst is a new software-development tool that allows developers to write apps that can run on macOS, iOS and iPadOS. Apple demonstrated several ported apps, including Jira and Twitter (after the latter discontinued its macOS app in February 2018).

System extensions
An upgrade from Kexts. System extensions avoid the problems of Kexts. There are 3 kinds of System extensions: Network Extensions, Endpoint Security Extensions, and Driver Extensions. System extensions run in userspace, outside of the kernel. Catalina will be the last version of macOS to support legacy system extensions.

DriverKit
A replacement for IOKit device drivers, driver extensions are built using DriverKit. DriverKit is a new SDK with all-new frameworks based on IOKit, but updated and modernized. It is designed for building device drivers in userspace, outside of the kernel.

Gatekeeper
Mac apps, installer packages, and kernel extensions that are signed with a Developer ID must be notarized by Apple to run on macOS Catalina.

Activation Lock

Activation Lock helps prevent the unauthorized use and drive erasure of devices with an Apple T2 security chip (2018, 2019, and 2020 MacBook Pro; 2020 5K iMac; 2018, 2019, and 2020 MacBook Air, iMac Pro; 2018 Mac Mini; 2019 Mac Pro).

Dedicated system volume
The system runs on its own read-only volume, separate from all other data on the Mac.

Voice control
Users can give detailed voice commands to applications. On-device machine processing is used to offer better navigation.

Sidecar
Sidecar allows a Mac to use an iPad (running iPadOS) as a wireless external display. With Apple Pencil, the device can also be used as a graphics tablet for software running on the computer. Sidecar requires a Mac with Intel Skylake CPUs and newer (such as the fourth-generation MacBook Pro), and an iPad that supports Apple Pencil.

Support for wireless game controllers
The Game Controller framework adds support for two major console game controllers: the PlayStation 4's DualShock 4 and the Xbox One controller.

Time Machine
A number of under-the-hood changes were made to Time Machine, the backup software. For example, the manner in which backup data is stored on network-attached devices was changed, and this change is not backwards-compatible with earlier versions of macOS.
Apple declined to document these changes, but some of them have been noted.

Applications

iTunes
iTunes is replaced by separate Music, Podcasts, TV and Books apps, in line with iOS. iOS device management is now conducted via Finder. The TV app on Mac supports Dolby Atmos, Dolby Vision, and HDR10 on MacBooks released in 2018 or later, while 4K HDR playback is supported on Macs released in 2018 or later when connected to a compatible display.

Find My
Find My Mac and Find My Friends are merged into an application called Find My.

Notes
The Notes application was enhanced to allow better management of checklists and the ability to share folders with other users. The application version was incremented from 4.6 (in macOS 10.14 Mojave) to 4.7.

Reminders
Among other visual and functional overhauls, attachments can be added to reminders and Siri can intelligently estimate when to remind the user about an event.

Voice Memos
The Voice Memos application, first ported from iOS to the Mac in macOS 10.14 Mojave as version 2.0, was incremented to version 2.1.

Removed or changed components
macOS Catalina exclusively supports 64-bit applications. 32-bit applications no longer run (including all software that utilizes the Carbon API as well as QuickTime 7 applications, image, audio and video codecs). Apple has also removed all 32-bit-only apps from the Mac App Store.

Z shell (executable "zsh") is the default login shell and interactive shell in macOS Catalina, replacing Bash, the default shell since Mac OS X Panther in 2003. Bash continues to be available in macOS Catalina, along with other shells such as csh/tcsh and ksh.

Dashboard has been removed in macOS Catalina.

The ability to add Backgrounds in Photo Booth was removed in macOS Catalina.

The command-line interface GNU Emacs application was removed in macOS Catalina.

Built-in support for Perl, Python 2.7 and Ruby are included in macOS for compatibility with legacy software. Future versions of macOS will not include scripting language runtimes by default, possibly requiring users to install additional packages.

Legacy AirDrop for connecting with Macs running Mac OS X Lion, Mountain Lion and Mavericks, or 2011 and older Macs has been removed.

Reception
Catalina received favorable reviews on release for some of its features. However, some critics found the OS version distinctly less reliable than earlier versions. The broad addition of user-facing security measures (somewhat analogous to the addition of User Account Control dialog boxes with Windows Vista a decade earlier) was criticized as intrusive and annoying.

Release history

Timeline of Mac operating systems

References

External links
 – official site
macOS Catalina download page at Apple

2019 software
Computer-related introductions in 2019
15
X86-64 operating systems